Adnan Yurdaer (7 August 1908 – 16 April 1982) was a Turkish wrestler. He competed in the men's Greco-Roman middleweight at the 1936 Summer Olympics.

References

External links
 

1908 births
1982 deaths
Turkish male sport wrestlers
Olympic wrestlers of Turkey
Wrestlers at the 1936 Summer Olympics
Place of birth missing